Madama is a Palestinian village in the Nablus Governorate.

Location 
It is bordered by Burin to the east, Asira al-Qibliya to the west and south, and Tell and Iraq Burin to the north.

History

Ottoman era
The population was 36 households, all Muslim. They paid a  fixed  tax rate of 33,3% on agricultural products, including  wheat, barley, summer crops, olive trees, goats and beehives, in addition to occasional revenues and a fixed tax for people of Nablus area; a total of 6,250  akçe.

In 1882, the PEF's  Survey of Western Palestine (SWP) described Madama as: "a small hamlet in a valley."

British Mandate era
In the  1922 census of Palestine conducted by the British Mandate authorities, Madama had a population of  170, all Muslims, increasing in the 1931 census  to 211, still all Muslims, in a total of 67  houses.

In the  1945 statistics Madama had a population of 290  Muslims  and a total of 3,361 dunams of land, according to an official land and population survey. Of this, 162 dunams were plantations and irrigable land, 1,943 used for cereals, while 30 dunams were built-up land.

Jordanian era
In the wake of the 1948 Arab–Israeli War, and after the 1949 Armistice Agreements,  Madama came  under Jordanian rule.

The Jordanian census of 1961 found 456 inhabitants in Madama.

Post-1967
Since the Six-Day War in 1967,  Madama  has been under Israeli occupation.

After the 1995 accords, 62 % of  Madama  land was defined as Area B, while the remaining 32% was defined as Area C. Israel has confiscated 139  dunams of land from Madama in order to construct the Israeli settlement of Yitzhar.

Settler violence

In 2006, an incident occurred in Madama in which neighbouring Israeli settlers both "poisoned the village's only well and shot at aid workers who came to clean it."

In May, 2017, Israeli settlers, apparently from Yitzhar, attacked a Palestinian shepherd from Madama. The Palestinian was "bleeding profusely", and was sent to a hospital in Nablus. The Israeli soldiers "fired in the air, dispersing the assailants", but none of the attackers were arrested.

In April 2018, Israeli soldiers were filmed "cheering after shooting unarmed Palestinian with rubber bullets"  by a  roadblock by Madama.

In May, 2019, it was reported that Israeli settlers from Yitzhar had started razing and levelling Palestinian-owned agricultural lands in Madama, in order to make a settler-only road.

In September, 2019, settlers from Yitzhar  stormed the southern part of Madama and set fire to  olive trees.

References

Bibliography

External links 
Welcome To Madama
Survey of Western Palestine, Map 11:  IAA, Wikimedia commons
Madama Village Profile, Applied Research Institute–Jerusalem, ARIJ
Madama photo, ARIJ
 Development Priorities and Needs in Madama, ARIJ

Nablus Governorate
Villages in the West Bank
Municipalities of the State of Palestine